Brasilsat B2 is a Brazilian communications satellite launched on 28 March 1995, at 23:14:19 UTC, by an Ariane 44LP H10+ launch vehicle at Kourou in French Guiana.

History 
The Boeing Company contracted the acquisition of three satellites from Hughes Electronics Corporation. As part of the contract, Hughes would divide the work with Promon Engenharia SA of São Paulo. Brasilsat B1 and B2 were tested by the National Institute for Space Research (INPE) of São José dos Campos, Brasilsat B3 and B4 were tested in the Hughes laboratories. The contract also included renovation of sensor equipment and telemetry, provided by Guaratiba Center for Satellite Signaling, located in Rio de Janeiro, as well as automation and installation of security equipment in the Tanguá Control Station.

Current status 
In January 2008, Brasilsat B2 was moved from its former orbital position at 65° West to 92° West. Brasilsat B2 is now in inclined orbit at 63° West.

Of the four Brasilsat satellites, only Brasilsat B3 and Brasilsat B4 are currently(?) transmitting signals.

Main characteristics 
 Original orbital position: 65° West
 Current orbital position: 63.1° West (inactive)
 Coverage: Brazil
 Transponders: 28 C-band, 1 X-band
 Launch date: 28 March 1995
 Model: Hughes HS-376W
 Launch location/vehicle: Centre Spatial Guyanais / Ariane 44LP
 Planned life of satellite: 12 years

References

External links 
 

Communications satellites in geostationary orbit
Spacecraft launched in 1995
Satellites using the HS-376 bus
Star One satellites